Aşağı Surra (also, Ashaga-Sura and Ashagy Surra) is a village and municipality in the Neftchala Rayon of Azerbaijan.  It has a population of 4,338.

References 

Populated places in Neftchala District